Joseph Griffin may refer to:

Joseph Ruble Griffin (1923–1988), Justice of the Supreme Court of Mississippi from 1986 to 1988
Joe Griffin (born c. 1972), American basketball player

See also
Arthur Joseph Griffin (born 1988), American professional baseball pitcher
Daniel Joseph Griffin (1880–1926), New York lawyer and Democratic politician
John Joseph Griffin (1802–1877), English chemist and publisher
Martin Ignatius Joseph Griffin (1842–1911), American Catholic journalist and historian